Ántevamena is a rural town in the region of Atsimo-Andrefana, Madagascar.

References

 

Populated places in Atsimo-Andrefana